Jovanka Broz (7 December 1924 –  20 October 2013) was the First Lady of Yugoslavia as the wife of Yugoslav president Josip Broz Tito. She was a lieutenant colonel in the Yugoslav People's Army.

She was married to Tito from 1952 until his death in 1980. Following her husband's death, all of her property was seized and she moved to a state-owned villa, where she reportedly lived under virtual house arrest.

Early life
Jovanka Budisavljević was born on 7 December 1924, to an ethnic Croatian Serb family of Milica and Milan "Mićo" Budisavljević in Pećane near Udbina, in the historical Krbava and Lika regions of Croatia, at the time part of the Kingdom of Serbs, Croats and Slovenes. In April 1941, when World War II started in Yugoslavia, the Budisavljević family was forced to flee the violently anti-Serb Ustasha regime of the Independent State of Croatia, which targeted one third of the prečani Serbs for forced conversion to Catholicism, another third for expulsion and the final third for extermination. The family's house was eventually burned down by the Ustasha troops. She joined the Yugoslav Partisans shortly thereafter, at the age of 17.

Life with and around Tito

Former JNA General Marjan Kranjc says Jovanka was assigned to the Marshal as early as 1945 as part of the personnel that checked his food and overall cleanliness for the purpose of preventing disease. After the death of Tito's great love , whose grave is in the Royal Compound in Dedinje, in 1946, Jovanka became his personal secretary according to Kranjc. "In this way she became a part of the inner most security ring around Tito and had to sign a secret cooperation agreement with the State Security Service (SDB), which was the law" - says Kranjc.

Initial relationship
Milovan Đilas, one of the communist revolutionary movement's leading members and ideologues, and a subsequent dissident, provides more details about Jovanka during this period in Druženje s Titom (Friendship with Tito). According to him, the relationship with Tito was extremely difficult for her:
She never appeared outside of Tito's company. We'd see her many times as she was keeping a vigil for hours in a hallway [while we're holding a late-night meeting inside], to make sure she is available if Tito needs anything as he's going to sleep. Because of that, the wrath and the lack of trust she was receiving from other servants was almost inevitable. [According to what was on offer] the motives for her closeness to Tito could've been explained in endless ways, none of which would show her character in a good light: career climbing, cajolery, malicious female extravagance, exploitation of Tito's lonesomeness...

As far as she was concerned, Tito was a war and communist party deity for whom everyone was supposed to sacrifice everything they had. She was a woman deep in the process of comprehending Tito as a man, while also increasingly and devotedly falling in love with him. She was resigned to burn out or fade away, unknown and unrecognized if need be, next to the divine man about whom she dreamt and to whom she could only belong now that he has chosen her.

Marriage

The exact date of their marriage is also subject to debate. The secret wedding ceremony happened either during 1951 or in April 1952; however, the location of the ceremony is also not clear. Some sources say it took place in the posh Dunavka villa in Ilok while others list Belgrade's municipality of Čukarica as the location.

Deterioration

Many believed her to be a victim of the ambitions of various politicians who managed to manipulate the ageing Marshal into turning against his wife. According to Ivo Eterović, a writer and photographer with unprecedented decades-long access to Yugoslavia's ruling couple, "the main culprits for the Tito-Jovanka split are that pig Stane Dolanc and General Nikola Ljubičić". In 1975, Tito left their common home and she did not see him between 1977 and 1980 when he died. After Marshal Tito's death she lived in seclusion in Dedinje, a Belgrade suburb, under house arrest.
The house was in a very bad condition; nobody cared to repair anything. The roof was leaking, she did not have her pension or her documents (ID and passport and health insurance card). She lived without heating for 8 years. She got her ID and passport in 2009. They took her car, so she was not able to go to her husband's grave when she wanted to. The government had to be notified if she left the house. She had practically no human rights for 30 years.

Death

Broz was hospitalized on 23 August 2013, and died from a heart attack in a Belgrade hospital on 20 October 2013, aged 88. She was buried in The House of Flowers mausoleum near her husband's grave.

Memoirs 
The book titled “My Life, My Truth”, was released just three weeks before she died and is being sold at newsstands.

Honours 
  : Dame Grand Cross of the National Order of Merit (8 May 1956).
  : Dame Grand Cross of the Order of the Crown (22 October 1970).
  Iran : Commemorative Medal of the 2500th Anniversary of the founding of the Persian Empire (14 October 1971).
  Nepalese Royal Family: Member First Class of the Most Illustrious Order of the Three Divine Powers (2 February 1974).

References in popular culture 
In the long-running British science fiction television series Doctor Who, the fictional character of Tegan Jovanka, one of the companions of the 
Fourth and Fifth Doctors, and one of the longest running companions of the Doctor, got the name as a combination of Tegan, named by one of the producers' niece, and Jovanka, after Jovanka Broz.

References

External links

1924 births
2013 deaths
First Ladies of Yugoslavia
People from Belgrade
People from Udbina
Women in the Yugoslav Partisans
Yugoslav Partisans members
Serbs of Croatia
Josip Broz Tito
Officers of the Yugoslav People's Army
Grand Cross of the Ordre national du Mérite
Members of the Order of Tri Shakti Patta, First Class
Disease-related deaths in Serbia